Omar Alejandro Gonzalez (born October 11, 1988) is an American professional soccer player who plays as a center-back for the New England Revolution of Major League Soccer.

A college soccer player for the Maryland Terrapins, he joined the LA Galaxy in the 2009 MLS SuperDraft, and went on to play 180 regular-season games for them, winning the MLS Cup in 2011, 2012 and 2014. He was named the MLS Rookie of the Year in 2009 and the MLS Defender of the Year in 2011.

A full international since 2010, he represented the United States at the 2014 FIFA World Cup and four CONCACAF Gold Cups, winning the 2013 and 2017 edition.

Club career

Early life and college
Gonzalez played youth soccer for the Dallas Texans Soccer Club, and played college soccer at the University of Maryland, College Park, where he won the 2008 College Cup championship, was named to the NCAA/Adidas All-American First Team and First Team All-ACC and was named the ACC Defensive Player of the Year as a sophomore in 2007.

LA Galaxy
Gonzalez was drafted in the first round (3rd overall) of the 2009 MLS SuperDraft by the Los Angeles Galaxy. Gonzalez began a regular feature in the Galaxy lineup from the start, and scored his first professional goal on April 4, 2009, against Colorado Rapids. He was named MLS Rookie of the Year for helping lead the Galaxy from a last-place finish in 2008.

In the 2010 season, Gonzalez scored a total of three goals including in the second leg of the Conference Semifinals.

In January 2012, Gonzalez was loaned to 1. FC Nürnberg of the Bundesliga until mid-February. During his first training session with his new club, Gonzalez suffered a torn anterior cruciate ligament to his left knee after a collision with national teammate Timothy Chandler. He immediately headed back to the U.S. to undergo surgery.

In August 2013, Gonzalez became Galaxy's third Designated Player after signing a new multi-year contract, rumored to be an annual average of more than $1.5 million. Gonzalez is the first pure center back to ever earn a Designated Player contract in Major League Soccer.

Pachuca
On December 22, 2015, Gonzalez was sold to Pachuca of Liga MX, ending his seven-season stay with the Galaxy. During their press conference with a Star Wars theme, Gonzalez was unveiled as Star Wars character Darth Vader in presentation.

Gonzalez made his league debut on January 8, 2016, in a 1–1 draw against Club Tijuana at Estadio Caliente. In his debut, Gonzalez registered an assist to Franco Jara to tie the match in the 43rd minute. On February 7, 2016, Gonzalez scored his first goal for Pachuca late against Pumas UNAM to salvage a 1–1 draw. Gonzalez won the Liga MX championship with Pachuca in his first season being a key player in the team's defense. At the start of the Apertura 2016 Gonzalez changed jersey numbers and was given the number 4 after the loan of Hugo Isaác Rodríguez ended.

Toronto FC

On June 3, 2019, it was announced that Gonzalez would join Toronto FC from Pachuca once the transfer market officially opened on July 9.  He was signed using Targeted Allocation Money (TAM). He made his debut for Toronto on 14 July, against rivals Montreal Impact. He scored his first goal for the club on 29 September against the Chicago Fire. In December 2021, Toronto FC confirmed that Gonzalez' contract option would not be picked up for the 2022 season.

New England Revolution
On December 22, 2021, Gonzalez signed with the New England Revolution through the 2023 season.

Gonzalez had a difficult start to the 2022 season for his new club. Through June 1st, Gonzalez, who was primarily signed as a backup but was forced into regular service due to injuries to Henry Kessler and Jon Bell, ranked in the bottom half of the MLS for defenders in successful pressures and blocks and in the bottom 25% for tackles, interceptions, and various other passing-out-of-the-back metrics. Gonzalez’s plus-minus was second-worst amongst center backs, and his plus-minus net was the worst amongst center backs at -1.08, according to stats from Football Reference.

On April 9th Miami's Bryce Duke beat Gonzalez to cross to striker Leonardo Campana, who beat Brad Knighton from close range to give Miami a 3–2 lead in the 88th minute.

On May 7, 2022 New England surrendered an 89th minute equalizer to Columbus Crew after Gonzalez lost his mark on Crew winger Erik Hurtado, who steered the ball into the net at point-blank range past Matt Turner.

On May 28th, 2022, Gonzalez' poor clearance landed at the feet of Union forward Mikael Uhre who equalized in the 77th minute, nullifying Gustavo Bou's 75th minute goal. Ultimately the match ended 1–1.

International career
On August 10, 2010, Gonzalez made his debut for the United States' first team in a friendly against Brazil.

On March 26, 2013, Gonzalez was given the start in central defense in the United States' 0–0 draw in a World Cup qualifier against Mexico at Estadio Azteca in Mexico City. According to Jeff Carlisle of ESPN, Gonzalez "was the man of the match by a clear margin".

Gonzalez was included on Jurgen Klinsmann's 23-man roster for the 2014 World Cup. He started in the final group match against Germany, and the round of 16 match versus Belgium.

On October 10, 2017, Gonzalez scored an own goal in the final game of the 2018 World Cup qualifiers against Trinidad and Tobago which resulted in a 2–1 loss which prevented the United States from qualifying for the 2018 World Cup.

Personal life
Born in the United States to Mexican parents, Gonzalez holds a U.S. and Mexican citizenship.

Career statistics

Club

International
As of match played June 30, 2019. Scores and results list the United States's goal tally first.

|-
| 1. || July 18, 2015 || M&T Bank Stadium, Baltimore, United States ||  ||  ||  || 2015 CONCACAF Gold Cup ||
|-
| 2. || July 12, 2017 || Raymond James Stadium, Tampa, United States ||  ||  ||  || rowspan="2"|2017 CONCACAF Gold Cup||
|-
| 3. || July 19, 2017 || Lincoln Financial Field, Philadelphia, United States ||  ||  || ||
|}

Honors
University of Maryland
NCAA Men's Division I Soccer Championship: 2008

LA Galaxy
MLS Cup: 2011, 2012, 2014
Supporters' Shield: 2010, 2011

Pachuca
Liga MX: Clausura 2016
CONCACAF Champions League: 2016–17

United States
CONCACAF Gold Cup: 2013, 2017

Individual
MLS Rookie of the Year: 2009
MLS Defender of the Year: 2011
MLS Best XI: 2010, 2011, 2013, 2014
CONCACAF Gold Cup Best XI: 2017

References

External links

 
 
 

1988 births
Living people
American sportspeople of Mexican descent
American soccer players
American expatriate soccer players
Soccer players from Dallas
LA Galaxy players
1. FC Nürnberg players
C.F. Pachuca players
Atlas F.C. footballers
Toronto FC players
Maryland Terrapins men's soccer players
Footballers at the 2007 Pan American Games
LA Galaxy draft picks
Major League Soccer players
Major League Soccer All-Stars
Designated Players (MLS)
Liga MX players
Expatriate footballers in Mexico
American expatriate soccer players in Germany
American expatriate sportspeople in Mexico
NCAA Division I Men's Soccer Tournament Most Outstanding Player winners
United States men's youth international soccer players
United States men's international soccer players
2013 CONCACAF Gold Cup players
2014 FIFA World Cup players
2015 CONCACAF Gold Cup players
2017 CONCACAF Gold Cup players
CONCACAF Gold Cup-winning players
Association football defenders
All-American men's college soccer players
2019 CONCACAF Gold Cup players
Pan American Games competitors for the United States